Chanea is a genus of Chinese spiders in the family Mysmenidae first discovered in 2009. The name is derived from the Chinese word for "coil", referring to the coiled whip-like extension of the palpal bulb, a defining characteristic of the genus. There are two species in the genus, one described in 2009 and the other in 2016.

References

Araneomorphae genera
Spiders of China